The Southwest Florida Copperheads are an American rugby league team  based in Florida. 2018 was their inaugural season in the USA Rugby League.

2018 season

2019 season

Current 2020 squad 

Kyle Van Deventer
Jason Gross
Abdrew Riordan
Kevin Kumundu
Heiko Dannemann
Jitoko JT Tabua
Ty Elkins
Janson Doughty
Ted Pearce
Vincent Stearman-Camacho
Colin O'Dell
Michael Khan
Rafael Rottiers
Gavin Schell
Jude Kurmundu
Andres Abreu jr
Roderigus Ceaser
Arnold Mananu
Makafana Palu
William Huie
Claudio Ormeno
Curtis Goddard

USARL season summaries

See also

Rugby league in the United States

References

External links
 Official website
 Facebook page

USA Rugby League teams
Sports teams in Florida
Lee County, Florida
2018 establishments in Florida
Rugby clubs established in 2018
Rugby league in Florida